Vladimir Viktorovich Storozhenko (April 11, 1953 – September 22, 1982), known as The Smolensk Strangler, was a Soviet serial killer.

Biography 
Storozhenko graduated from 8th grade of the 16th Smolensk High School. As a difficult teenager, he was known to police, as he engaged in petty theft, also torturing and killing domestic animals. He also showed heightened sexual interest and cruelty towards girls. Storozhenko was convicted twice, among his charges allegedly including rape. After his second release, he began work as a chauffeur at a car park. He married, and a son was born. Storozhenko had a reputation as an exemplary family man, and was characterized as a positive employee at work.

Between 1978 and 1981, there were about 20 attacks on women and girls in Smolensk and its environs, 13 of which resulted in murder involving rape. He committed the first murder in the historic part of the city, not far from the Assumption Cathedral. Storozhenko was not a  strangler  in the literal sense of the word, as he sadistically tortured and finished off victims in various ways; one of his victims of the murderer was a 12-year-old student of the 31st Smolensk Secondary School, whose body was found in a sand pit with signs of torture. Once, the killer attacked a woman who turned out to be a decoy,   a law enforcement officer, but Storozhenko was then frightened off by one of the policemen in the ambush. During the fight, he left traces of blood, as a result of which the criminal's blood type was established. It is also noteworthy that Storozhenko himself was a police informant and participated in the searches for the  strangler.

Four innocent people were arrested for Storozhenko's crimes: the first was an employee of the prosecutor's office, and before his innocence was proven, he spent 9 months in jail, after his release he had to resign from the prosecutor's office and leave the city; as an accomplice of the previous one, a traffic policeman was arrested; in the murder of a woman in the recreation area of the Smolensk Aviation Plant, the authorities accused a local guard who had previously been convicted of collaborationism during the Second World War, who, under the pressure of investigators, incriminated himself; and the final being a person caught for stealing, and under the threat of execution, was forced to confess to killing his wife and sentenced to 9 years imprisonment.

Storozhenko was arrested in 1981: the last victim survived and remembered a tattoo on his chest, and then identified him from the presented photo. Storozhenko was then questioned about his carpool travel sheets - their data matched up with the time and place of the crime. His blood type also coincided with the one found under the nails of the murdered women. Storozhenko's wife admitted that he had given her gold earrings that belonged to one of the victims. A gold ingot was found hidden in his apartment, under the bed of his paralyzed mother. Storozhenko's brother, Sergei, admitted that he knew about what his brother was doing, and said that the ingot is the melted decoration of his victims. He then indicated where other things were hidden. In addition, during the search, a cache of pistols and explosives were found: Sergei confessed that he and his brother had planned a series of attacks on state-owned enterprises on the days when they would issue wages there. When the last victim identified him a police line-up, Vladimir Storozhenko began to confess. During the course of the investigation, an experiment was conducted: out of 30 female dummies, 13 had the clothes of his victims, in whose pockets were notes with the name of the victim, the time and place of the body's discovery. He managed to accurately indicated the clothing of his victims. The investigation into the Storozhenko case was conducted by the famous investigator Issa Kostoyev, who later led the Chikatilo case.

In 1983, the court upheld the death sentence by firing squad for Storozhenko, after which he was executed the following year. Sergei Storozhenko was convicted of criminal conspiracy and sentenced to 15 years imprisonment. While serving his sentence, he unsuccessfully tried to escape, and another 3 years were added to his sentence.

In the media 
 Documentary film from the series  The Investigation Led  —   Loop 
 Documentary film from the series  Legends of the Soviet Investigation  —    Devil's Puzzle

See also
 List of Russian serial killers
 List of serial killers by number of victims

References

External links
 Smolensk Strangler Vladimir Storozhenko
 Issa Kostoyev: Russia is the underworld. Angel and leopard (From the practice of Issa Kostoyev)

1953 births
1982 deaths
Executed Soviet serial killers
Male serial killers
Murderers of children
People executed by the Soviet Union by firearm
People executed for murder
People from Smolensk
Soviet rapists